Walter Ziffer (born 5 March 1927, Těšín, Czechoslovakia) is a Czechoslovak-born American author, engineer, and Holocaust survivor. 

After immigrating to the United States, Ziffer received an engineering degree from Vanderbilt University, two master's degrees from the Graduate School of Theology of Oberlin College and a doctorate in theology from the University of Strasbourg in early Christian history, Biblical Hebrew and comparative religion. 

He is the author of many books including Confronting the Silence: A Holocaust Survivor's Search for God and has spoken regularly throughout Western North Carolina regarding his experiences throughout the Holocaust.

Early life during the Holocaust 
In 1942, as a young teenager, Ziffer was seized from his home and taken to a Jewish Ghetto in what is now the Czech Republic. Soon after arriving in the Jewish Ghetto, Walter found unexpected happiness. Walter fell in love with a blonde girl named Lydia, and spent nearly all of his free time with her. After a few weeks of being together, Lydia told Walter that she and her family would attempt to flee the Ghetto and seek asylum in the Soviet Union. Before she left, she gave him a golden pendant from her necklace and engraved in the pendant were the words, I love you. Days after Lydia's escape, members of the Jewish community went to Walters dad and informed him that Lydia and her parents had been killed. 

Soon separated from his family, Ziffer was sent to seven Nazi slave labor Concentration camps throughout the war. At the age of 18, he was finally liberated by Soviet troops and eventually was able to reunite with his parents and some of his siblings, who had been held in separate camps and also survived until their liberation. He returned home and apprenticed as a mechanic, then, years later moved to the U.S. with only 5 dollars to his name, he later worked for General Motors as an engineer.

Walter in his book, Confronting the Silence: A Holocaust Survivor's Search for God, Walter tells many stories about his time in the seven internment camps. He speaks on one specific occasion while in a camp called Brande located in Silesia, Poland. During his time in this camp, he was a part of a slave labor camp he was favored by an inmate commander, Pompe. 

This commander provided him with extra bread that had been stolen from other inmates. He was forced to do things like clean up dead bodies within the wash barracks. While he worked in these factories, Walter even gained some of his engineering skills while being enslaved in these factories.

Later in life after the Holocaust 
In Dr. Ziffer's later years, his work mostly revolved around his teachings and lecturing at various higher education institutions and writings regarding Christianity's views towards Judaism, and guest lecturing about his experiences in the Holocaust. He published The Birth of Christianity from the Matrix of Judaism: From Jewish Sect to World Religion in 2006 and The Teaching of Disdain: An Examination of Christology and New Testament Attitudes Toward Jews in 2017 regarding these historical points of intersection between Christianity and Judaism which caused negativity and hatred.

In his personal memoirs of Confronting the Silence: A Holocaust Survivor’s Search for God, he expands upon his conviction that he does not believe in God or a higher power saved him from death during the Holocaust, but rather that it was pure luck that he survived the seven concentration camps to which he was sent. He once said during an interview, "I cannot subscribe to their view of attributing my survival to God’s protection. I do not and wish not to see me singled out in some way by God from the rest of world Jew[s], of whom one-third perished by Hitler and his henchmen during the Holocaust. How could God make me survive while one and a half million innocent children went to their death without God intervening on their behalf?"

Speeches regarding the Holocaust by Ziffer 
Welcome to lectures by Walter Ziffer

Links to Ziffer's writings 
Profile, amazon.com. Accessed 19 January 2023.

References 

1927 births
Jewish concentration camp survivors
Czechoslovak Jews
People from Český Těšín
Oberlin College alumni
Vanderbilt University alumni
Czechoslovak emigrants to the United States
Living people